Maersk Air Ltd, trading as Maersk Air UK, was a British airline which operated between 1993 and 2003. It flew out of Birmingham Airport to domestic and European destinations under a British Airways franchise agreement. The company was owed by the eponymous A. P. Møller–Mærsk Group through its Danish subsidiary airline Maersk Air and was based at the grounds of Birmingham Airport. At its peak it operated twelve aircraft and had 490 employees.

The airline was created through the demerger of Brymon European Airways, which had been created through the mergers of Brymon Airways and Birmingham European Airways (BEA). Maersk took over the former BEA operations, while its co-owner, British Airways, took over the ex-Brymon operations. Maersk Air UK commenced operations with BAC One-Eleven and Jetstream 31 aircraft. These were later replaced with Boeing 737-500s and a Jetstream 41. From 1999 these were again replaced with Bombardier CRJ200 and CRJ700s. The airline was sold through a management buyout to become Duo Airways.

History

Birmingham Executive Airways, later Birmingham European Airways, was established in 1983. Based at Birmingham Airport, it operated a fleet of three Jetstream 31s, three Gulfstream Is and five BAC One-Elevens. The airline was designated carrier out of Birmingham, having taken over a series of routes formerly operated by British Airways. However, the airline failed to make a profit on its seven international services out of Birmingham.

Maersk Air stated in 1988 that regional airlines in Europe needed to tighter linked. Based on this they bought a forty-percent stake in Brymon Airways' holding company, Plimsoll Line, in November 1988. The other major shareholder was British Airways. Brymon was based at London City Airport, but had failed to make a profit since operations commenced. BEA was bought by the Plimsoll Line in 1988s.

By 1991 BEA's revenue had tripled to £56.7 million, although its deficits plummeted eightfold to £11.8 million. The two companies were merged in October 1992 and renamed Brymon European Airways. However, the two parts of the airline has vastly different scopes, fleets and strategies and few synergies could be taken advantage of. Maersk and British Airways therefore decided to split up the company. The company was demerged in May 1993, with British Airways taking over the former Brymon operations and Maersk taking over the former Birmingham operations. The latter was renamed Maersk Air UK. BA also took over Plymouth Airport in a move in which both airlines bought new shares worth £6 million.

Meanwhile, BA developed a plan to establish a series of regional airlines modeled after the United States. In addition to Brymon and Maersk Air UK, the franchising was adapted for BA CityFlyer.

At the time of commencing operations in July 1993, Maersk Air UK operated a fleet of five BAC One-Elevens and three Jetstream 31s out of Birmingham Airport. Routes were flown to Amsterdam, Belfast, Copenhagen, Cork, Dublin, Glasgow, Milan, Newcastle and Stuttgart. As of 1994 it had 185 employees. The airline carried out a major overhaul of its fleet in 1996. The four One-Elevens were sold to Nationwide Air Charter and replaced with newer Boeing 737-500s. Meanwhile, a Jetstream 41 was transferred from British Airways, replacing the smaller Jetstream 31s. The services to Dublin, Cork and Glasgow were terminated and instead a route was started to Lyon.

Maersk saw its passenger numbers increase by 22 percent in 1997, ending at 550,000 passengers. At the end of the year it retained three One-Elevens and three 737-500s. In November the airline ordered three 50-seat Bombardier CRJ200s with an option for a further twelve of any combination of the CRJ200 and the larger 70-seat CRJ700. The airline preferred Bombardier over Embraer due to the availability of the 70-seat variant which would allow it to replace the aging One-Elevens. The fourth 737 was delivered in February 1998. The first CRJs were delivered in 1998 and by August 1999 there were six such aircraft in the fleet. The One-Eleves were retired in 1998 and the Jetstream 41 was pulled from service the following year.

The airline launched services to Geneva and Vienna in February 1999. In November routes were added to Stockholm and Rome. By 1999 the airline had grown to a staff of 347. A year later Berlin, Brussels, Frankfurt and Zürich had been added as destinations and the fleet grown to six 737-500s and six CRJ200s.

By 2001 the number of employees had risen to 490 and the first CRJ700 had been delivered. That year services commenced to Hamburg, Hanover and Marseille.
Meanwhile, British Airways was building up operates at Birmingham Airport through two other franchise agreements, with Brymond Airways and British Regional Airlines. The franchise agreement with Maersk, set to expire on 24 March 2001, was extended that month through the summer season. This spurred speculation that Maersk would abandon the franchising agreement. However, in August a five-year extension was signed.

From May 2002 Maersk Air commenced three new routes, to Bordeaux, Nice, Toulouse, all in France. By then the first two CRJ700s had been delivered, while the number of 737-500s was reduced to three. Services also commenced to Gothenburg, but by then the services to Brussels, Frankfurt, Newcastle, Rome and Zürich had been terminated.

Maersk Air UK lost an accumulative 325 million Danish krone (DKK) from 2000 through 2002. By early 2003 the Maersk Group had given up on operating an airline in the UK and put Maersk Air UK up for sale.  However, there were not interested buyers and it was speculated that British Airways would have to step in and take over the franchise. The company was therefore sold in a management buyout in 2003, with the airline becoming Duo Airways. At the time the airline had eight aircraft and 350 employees. Up till this point Maersk Air had lost DKK 250 million on its UK operations. The new company folded in 2004, and Maersk Air was forced to bring home five CRJs from Birmingham. Maersk lost a further DKK 65 million with the sale of these aircraft.

Operations

Maersk Air Ltd was a subsidiary of Maersk Air, a Danish airline again owned by the Maersk Group. Maersk Air UK was headquartered at Coventry Road near Birmingham Airport, which served as the airline's only base. The airline operated under a franchise agreement with British Airways. It employed the BA branding, including aircraft livery, uniforms, in-flight service and catering, as well as terminal services. It also employed BA's flight codes and reservation system. Flights qualified for miles on BA's frequent-flyer program, Executive Club.

Destinations
The following is a list of destinations served by Maersk Air UK. All scheduled services were flown out of their base at Birmingham Airport and were branded as British Airways flights.

Fleet

The following is a list of aircraft operated by Maersk Air UK. The airline did not own any of their aircraft themselves; instead, these were leased from its parent company.

See also
 List of defunct airlines of the United Kingdom

References

Bibliography

 

Defunct airlines of the United Kingdom
Airlines established in 1993
Airlines disestablished in 2003
British Airways
Maersk Air
Companies based in Solihull